Trenčianske Jastrabie is a village and municipality in Trenčín District in the Trenčín Region of northwestern Slovakia.

Names and etymology
The name comes from Slovak Jastrab (hawk). Jastrabie (1439 Jaztreby) — a place with many hawks and/or a place where hawks are trained for falconry. Former official Slovak names were also Jastrabie pod Inovcom, Jastrabie pri Trenčíne, since 1946 Trenčianske Jastrabie.

History
The village was first mentioned in historical records in 1269.

Geography
It has a population of about 1206 people.

References 

Villages and municipalities in Trenčín District